The Noble Rot is the tenth studio album by American industrial metal band Powerman 5000. It was released on August 28, 2020 through Cleopatra Records.

Track listing

Personnel

Members
 Spider One - Vocals, Production, Artwork
 Greg Johnson - Additional Guitars, Production
 Murv Douglas - Bass
 Taylor Haycraft - Rhythm Guitars
 Ty Oliver - Lead Guitars
 DJ Rattan - Drums, Percussions

Reception
The Noble Rot received favourable reviews. Dawn Brown of Metal Wani gave it a rating of 8/10, commenting that "while this album very much follows the general nature and disposition of Powerman 5000, it’s really not a metal album.  It walks a fine line between industrial and electronica. However, the lyrics are offbeat, eccentric, and expertly crafted for the songs therein.  ‘The Noble Rot’ is a must-listen if you’re a fan of Powerman 5000 or the fantastic camp of a B-movie." Jeannie Blue of Cryptic Rock gave it 5/5 stars. She noted that "despite a plethora of lineup changes that have left Spider as the last original man standing, eight additional records have followed over the past 21 years, including 2001’s Anyone for Doomsday?, 2006’s Destroy What You Enjoy, and 2017’s New Wave. But nothing can keep a good band down."

References

Powerman 5000 albums